Mohamed Rasheed may also refer to:

 Mohamed Rasheed (actor) (born 1964), Maldivian film actor, cinematographer, producer and director
 Mohamed Rasheed (swimmer) (born 1968), Maldivian swimmer
 Mohamed Rasheed (footballer) (born 1985), Maldivian footballer